The 2016 Nigeria Entertainment Awards is the 11th edition of the Nigeria Entertainment Awards. Hosted by Richard Mofe Damijo and Ebbe Bassey, the event was held on September 4 at the BMCC Tribeca Performing Arts Center in New York City, U.S.

Performers

Winners and nominees
The awards were categorized into three categories: Music category, Film/TV category and Other category. Below is the list of nominees and winners for the popular music categories. Winners are highlighted in bold.

Music category

Film/TV categories

Other categories

References

2016 music awards
2016 in Nigerian music
Nigeria Entertainment Awards
2016 in Nigerian cinema
2016 in New York City